Pahartali is a thana of Chattogram District in Chattogram Division, Bangladesh.

Geography
It has a total area 8.44 km².
It is bounded by Sitakunda Upazila on the north, Halishahar and Double Mooring thanas on the south, Khulshi Thana on the east, and the Bay of Bengal on the west.

Demographics
At the 1991 Bangladesh census, Pahartali had a population of 198,894, of whom 109,571 were aged 18 or older. Males constituted 57.45% of the population, and females 42.55%. Pahartali had an average literacy rate of 54% (7+ years), against the national average of 32.4%.

See also
 Upazilas of Bangladesh
 Districts of Bangladesh
 Divisions of Bangladesh

References

Thanas of Chittagong District